This was the first edition of the tournament.

Wesley Koolhof and Matwé Middelkoop won the title, defeating Dino Marcan and Antonio Šančić in the final, 4–6, 6–3, [10–5].

Seeds

Draw

References
 Main Draw

ATP Challenger Torino - Doubles
2015 Doubles